Alan Marriott (born July 19, 1971) is a Canadian voice actor and instructor.

Marriott moved to Vancouver, British Columbia in 1980 to attend the Studio 58 acting school. He left Studio 58 to join the first season of Salmon Arm Summer Stock Youth Theatre (SASSY) and did two seasons with the company. Marriott spent four years working with the improvisational theatre group Vancouver Theatresports and also played the character of Aldous Bacon in VSL's original production of Suspect (an improvised murder mystery).

Marriott moved to London, England to complete his formal acting training at The London Academy of Music and Dramatic Art (LAMDA).  Upon finishing LAMDA Marriott began working in improv once again, starting London Theatresports and creating and playing in numerous different improv formats including Hamlet Improvised, Impro Lear, Impro Lab (London's first 2-act improvised play), The Impro Musical, Lust Boulavarde (an improvised soap opera), and Impropera (a 2-act improvised opera).

Marriott has worked with or taught almost every improvisational theatre group in London including:  Grand Theft Impro, Made Up Like Tarts, Scratch, Showstopper, The Comedy Store Players, Dogs on Holiday, Impro Musical, Impropera, Brickbats Volunteers, South of the River (with Steve Frost and Jeremy Hardy) and, his own current impro troupe, The Crunchy Frog Collective.

Currently he helps form and trains an impro troupe in Vancouver BC titled 3rd and Main and occasionally hosts their weekly shows at School Creative every Saturday at 8:00 pm.

Marriott has also done extensive voice acting work for radio and TV animation, including Mr. Fothergill, Travis, Spud (regular series only) and Scoop in the US dub on Bob the Builder and Glar on Planet 51. He also voiced Victor Volt in The Secret Show, and the characters Cowboy and Indian in A Town Called Panic.

He is the author of Genius Now!.

He also wrote one episode of Animal Stories (in which he narrated the American dubbed version for The Disney Channel), several comedy sketches for CBC and a short film called  Teeth and worked as a voice director for the BKN Classic Series trilogy where he directed the voices for all six of their films including  Alice in Wonderland: What's the Matter with Hatter?, The Jungle Book: Rikki-Tikki-Tavi to the Rescue, Robin Hood: Quest for the King, The Three Musketeers: Saving the Crown, The Prince and the Pauper: Double Trouble  and A Christmas Carol.

Marriott also had onscreen appearances on several British television series including Wake Up in the Wild Room,  The Bootleg Broadway Show, The All New Alexei Sayle Show, Ghost Train, Jo Brand Through the Cakehole and the TV movie Now What.

After twenty years living and working in London, England, Marriott moved back to Vancouver in 2008 and now makes his home in North Vancouver, British Columbia. He is the driving force behind ImprovMusical, a one-hour improvised musical based on a single audience suggestion which premiered in July 2010 and is currently playing at Vancouver Theatresports.

In 2016, Marriott recently voiced the characters Buried Lede and Mr. Stripes in the season six My Little Pony: Friendship is Magic episode "The Saddle Row Review".

Selected filmography
 Hot Wheels Battle Force 5 - Simon Ian Rhodes II
 Appleseed - Karon
 Junk Boy - Ryohei
 The Dark Myth - Takeshi
 Tokyo Babylon
 Devilman - Akira Fudo / Devilman (OVA)
 Mad Bull 34 - Daizaburo
 Urusei Yatsura (BBC 3 dub) - Chibi (Akira)
 X - Kamui Shirō (Movie)
 A Town Called Panic - Cowboy / Indian
 Monkey Magic - Shotenki
 Legend of the Dragon - Ang / Golden Dragon
 The Secret Show - Victor Volt
 Back to Gaya - Boo (English voice)
 Bob the Builder - Scoop / Travis / Dodger / Spud (1999-2004) / Mr. Bentley (1999-2004) (North American version)
 Teeth - Dr. Horace Morgan
 Anthony Ant - Anthony / Arnold / Buzz
 Bounty Hamster - Bounty Hamster
 Planet 51 - Glar / Mailman
 Dinosaur Train - Iggy Iguanodon / Mayor Kosmoceratops / Deon Dimetrodon
 Lego Ninjago: Masters of Spinjitzu - Captain Soto / Dareth / Hutchins
 Lego Star Wars: Droid Tales - Agent Kallus
 The Animal Stories - Narrator / Character Voices (North American version)
 Martha Speaks - Additional Voices
 Chop Socky Chooks - Iron Butt Monk
 Vampires, Pirates and Aliens - Zorb / Sharky / Gory
 Planet Sketch - Ninja Handyman
 Voltron Force - Sven
 Dork Hunters from Outer Space - Mac
 Pond Life - Gym Instructor
 Zorro: Generation Z - Don Ichy / Don Skull 
 Mama Mirabelle's Home Movies - Jacques the Walrus / Perry / Gerald the Giraffe (North American version)
 Yoko! Jakamoko! Toto!
 My Little Pony: Friendship is Magic - Buried Lede / Mr. Stripes
 Roary the Racing Car - Additional voices
 Nexo Knights - Chef Rambley / Mr. Cheddarton
 Twipsy - Nick
 The Feeble Files Santa's Special Delivery Globi and the Stolen Shadows - Maestro
 Dr. Vet - Dr. Vet
 Spheriks - Match Narrator
 A Christmas Carol - Collector for the Orphanage # 2 (uncredited)
 Geronimo Stilton Tom and Jerry in Fists of Furry Tom and Jerry in War of the Whiskers'' - Jerry, Tyke, Lion, Nibbles, Duckling

References

External links 
 
 
 Alan Marriott Com Homepage
 Genius Now at Biz Books

1971 births
Living people
Canadian comedy writers
Canadian expatriates in the United Kingdom
Canadian male screenwriters
Canadian male television actors
Canadian male television writers
Canadian male voice actors
Canadian television writers
Male actors from British Columbia
People from Penticton
Canadian voice directors
Writers from British Columbia